Köln Hauptbahnhof or Cologne Central Station is a railway station in Cologne, Germany. The station is an important local, national and international transport hub, with many ICE, Thalys and Intercity trains calling there, as well as regional Regional-Express, RegionalBahn and local S-Bahn trains. EuroNight and Nightjet night services also call at the station.  It has frequent connections to Frankfurt by way of the Cologne–Frankfurt high-speed rail line, which starts in southern Cologne. On an average day, about 280,000 travellers frequent the station, making it the fifth busiest station in Germany.

The station is situated next to Cologne Cathedral.

There is another important station in Cologne, the Köln Messe/Deutz station across the river Rhine, just about 400 metres away from Köln Hauptbahnhof. The stations are linked by the Hohenzollern Bridge, a six-track railway bridge with pedestrian and bicycle lanes on each side. Frequent local services connect the two stations.

History

By 1850 there were five stations at Cologne that had been built by different railway companies. On the west bank of the Rhine there were the Bonn-Cologne Railway Company (German, old spelling: Bonn-Cölner Eisenbahn-Gesellschaft, BCE), the Cologne-Krefeld Railway Company (German, old spelling: Cöln-Crefelder Eisenbahn-Gesellschaft, CCE) and the Rhenish Railway Company  (German: Rheinische Eisenbahn-Gesellschaft, RhE). On the east bank there were the Bergisch-Märkische Railway Company (German: Bergisch-Märkische Eisenbahn-Gesellschaft, BME) and the Cologne-Minden Railway Company (German, old spelling: Cöln-Mindener Eisenbahn-Gesellschaft, CME).

In 1854 a controversial decision was taken to locate a new rail and road bridge next to the cathedral, following consideration of such proposals as connecting the bridge to an existing freight yard and temporary passenger station on the banks of the Rhine (Rhine Station) at the street of Trankgasse, which is to the southeast of the current Hauptbahnhof. It was suggested that carriages could be lowered by lift to the Trankgasse station, but it was quickly realized that the only effective way for connecting the left and right bank line was to create a central station. The city agreed to the proposal in 1857 and made available the ground of the former Botanical garden to the north of the cathedral and on the site of part of the old University of Cologne, suppressed by the French in 1798. The railway track was laid at ground level from the bridge over the Rhine and crossing the street of Eigelstein west of the station at ground level and running through the medieval city wall.

Original  station 

The original Central Station (German: Centralbahnhof) was built beginning in 1857 to the plans of Hermann Otto Pflaume on behalf of the RhE, which had in the same year acquired the BCE. The station was opened on 5 December 1859 together with the Cathedral Bridge (German: Dombrücke, later the site of the Hohenzollernbrücke). The Central Station was a combined terminus and through station: it included four terminating tracks for the RhE running to the west, while the CME had two through tracks connected to its line on the eastern side of the Rhine by the Cathedral Bridge.

The station quickly reached capacity, but the RhE as operator had only limited interest in developing the station, as this would have mainly benefited competing companies. Serious planning for an enlarged station was therefore only taken after the nationalisation of the railways in Prussia in the 1880s.

New station

For the planning of the new central station two options were considered:
Construction of a major railway station in an open area north of Venloer Straße and reclassifying of the original station as a minor station, or
Replacement of the central station with a new building at the same place with an increase in platforms and the construction of two secondary passenger stations (Cologne West and Cologne South) on the urban railway on the model of Berlin Stadtbahn and a rail freight bypass.

While the Prussian government argued for the second option, opinion in Cologne was split. On 9 January 1883, the Cologne City Council decided by one vote, finally, for the second option under a plan by the engineer E. Grüttefien of Berlin. Construction began in 1889. The tracks were raised by six metres with half the new space created under the track filled with earth and a new entrance building was built to the design of Georg Frentzen, an architect from Aachen. The foundation stone was laid on 7 May 1892.

In 1894 the large tripartite platform hall was completed. The central hall had a roof span of 64 metres covering today's platforms 2 to 7, and outside it were two 13.5 metre-wide aisles for platforms 1 and 8. The 255 metre-long hall included a two-storey waiting room building, with easy access to all platforms.  The station included four terminating platforms facing east and four facing west on either side of the waiting rooms, with one through platform on the northeast side and one on the southwest side.

During the restructuring of the rail tracks in the Cologne area in about 1905–1911 (most notable for the construction of the new South Bridge and the four-track Hohenzollern Bridge), the waiting room building was removed and all the platforms were rebuilt as through platforms. Advantage was taken of the previously unused space beneath the tracks.

Only the first and second class waiting rooms in Trankgasse and Johannisstraße (streets) survived World War II and subsequent modifications and are now used as a restaurant and the Alter Wartesaal events centre.

Reconstruction and new construction

For several years after World War II, there was debate as to whether the main station should be rebuilt on the site of the Gereon freight yard—now the site of MediaPark.  Therefore, the reconstruction of the main railway station was a slow process and for a decade Cologne station included temporary structures.

The first building occurred in 1953 with the demolition of the long building on the western side, which was replaced by a modern building with baggage handling facilities and a hotel. The old station building (which had been only slightly damaged during the war and temporarily repaired) was demolished in 1955. On 23 September 1957, the new station hall with its shell-shaped roof was opened to the design of the architects Schmitt and Schneider. The main station building was built on the northern side of the station following the demolition of an originally built-up area between the streets of Maximinenstraße, Domstraße, Hofergasse and Hermannstraße and the shifting of Goldgasse with the building of Breslauer Platz as a second entrance plaza.

In the course of building the S-Bahn up until 1991, the entire railway line, railway station and the Hohenzollern bridge were supplemented by two independent S-Bahn tracks. First, in 1975 two additional platforms were built (10 and 11) and then the additional tracks were built on the Hohenzollern bridge for the S-Bahn line.

In 2000, a shopping centre was opened at the entry level—including the area under the S-Bahn tracks. The so-called colonnade includes 70 shops and restaurants with over 11,500 square metres of retail space and 700 employees.

Planning 

At a summit of Deutsche Bahn, the federal government and the state of North Rhine-Westphalia on 31 March 2010 in Düsseldorf, it was decided that the station should be extended by 2019 with an S-Bahn platform with two S-Bahn tracks at Breslauer Platz. The estimated cost would amount to €60 million.

It is planned to extend the platform for track 1 to provide a secure area for checking passenger and baggage to enable ICE trains to run to London-St Pancras in 2016. It will be operationally difficult for trains departing towards London to cross all the western approach tracks, as will be necessary.

Rail services 
Cologne Hauptbahnhof is one of the hubs of European long-distance traffic. Long-distance lines run on both sides of the Rhine via Cologne. Therefore, the station situated on the left (western) bank of the Rhine is connected to Köln Messe/Deutz station situated on the right (eastern) bank of the Rhine via the Hohenzollern Bridge. Long-distance trains connect in the station from the Ruhr region, southern Germany, Switzerland, the Netherlands and Belgium. Köln Messe/Deutz (tief) station is used by two ICE services on the right bank route. In the past, therefore, a direct connection, such as a moving walkway over the Rhine was considered, but this controversial idea was rejected as too expensive for the time being.

The Cologne rail node is at the centre of eleven routes radiating in all directions. More than 280,000 arriving and departing passengers are estimated to use 1,200 trains daily.

Cologne Hauptbahnhof, together with the Hohenzollern Bridge is a key bottleneck for rail transport in the Cologne region. Long-distance traffic load is concentrated to and from the east of the station, while regional trains mainly run to and from the west. The connecting lines from Hürth-Kalscheuren and Steinstraße are operating at capacity. Adding extra tracks is hardly possible. Changing the track layout is not possible with the existing signalling. The network will become increasingly congested up to 2030 and beyond.

Although its platforms are divided into three sections each, they are still remarkably crowded throughout the day, and a major extension of the station is impossible because of its historic surroundings. Connections to the local Cologne network Stadtbahn are made by two subterranean stations, Dom/Hbf and Breslauer Platz/Hbf at the respective ends of the station. The station has 11 main line passenger track platforms, of which two are used for S-Bahn services; one of the two subterranean Stadtbahn has two tracks with side platforms (Dom/Hbf) the other (Breslauer Platz/Hbf) has two out of three tracks in service and one side platform and an island platform (both in use). Its IATA code is QKL.

Long-distance services 

Cologne Hauptbahnhof is the hub of many Intercity Express and Intercity lines, mostly serving Cologne every hour or every two hours:

Various high-speed services connect most cities in Germany as well as several neighbouring countries in a few hours. Thalys high-speed trains run from Cologne to Paris via Aachen, Liege and Brussels. An international Intercity Express service also operates every two hours during the day on the Brussels–Liege—Aachen–Cologne line, continuing to Frankfurt.

With a combined 403 scheduled long-distance arrivals and departures each day at Cologne in the summer timetable  of 1989, it was the most important node in the network of Deutsche Bundesbahn. With 383 scheduled long-distance arrivals and departures, in Deutsche Bahn's timetable of summer 1996, it was the second most important node (after Hannover Hauptbahnhof).

Regional services

Cologne Hauptbahnhof is also a hub for numerous Regional-Express and Regionalbahn services, mostly serving the station in Cologne every half-hour or hour, but sometime only every two hours:

S-Bahn trains

Köln Hauptbahnhof is integrated in the Rhein-Sieg S-Bahn network. From Monday to Friday S-Bahn trains run at 20-minute intervals during the day and at other times usually every 30 minutes. It is also served on working days by the S19 service between Düren and Au (Sieg), running hourly but substituting for an S13 service. Northwest of the Cologne Hauptbahnhof S-Bahn station is the Köln Hansaring S-Bahn station and to the east is the Köln Messe/Deutz S-Bahn station. All S-Bahn services serving the station, use these two stations.

Local services

Below Cologne Hauptbahnhof there are two stations of the Cologne Stadtbahn. Stadtbahn stations Dom/Hauptbahnhof and Breslauer Platz/Hauptbahnhof are on the same tunnel that runs under the main station making a turn of 120 degrees. The former one is located below the southern end, next to the cathedral, the latter at the northern end where it connects to the bus station. Breslauer Platz/Hauptbahnhof station was relocated and completely redesigned up December 2011. Line 5 has been rerouted from Dom/Hauptbahnhof to Rathaus station to connect with the first open part of the north-south Stadtbahn tunnel, which is currently under construction. One year later line 5 was lengthened one station from Rathaus to Heumarkt. Formerly, all trains stopped at Dom/Hbf and Breslauer Platz/Hbf, but, as the junction for the new line will be between these stations, line 5 trains only stop at Dom/Hbf, and line 16 trains will only stop at Breslauer Platz/Hbf when the line is opened.

Currently Dom/Hbf station is served by the following lines (during the day at ten-minute intervals, line 18 at five-minute intervals), but Breslauer Platz/Hbf station is served only by lines 16 and 18:

Services are offered by the Cologne Stadtbahn and the Bonn Stadtbahn, often referred to as Stadtbahn Rhein-Sieg after the Verkehrsverbund Rhein-Sieg (VRS - Rhein-Sieg Transit Authority).

Future

London services
Since January 2010, a system of "open access" on European high-speed railway lines now permits different rail operators to apply to run high-speed passenger services.  DB Fernverkehr have announced their intention to operate a direct ICE service from Cologne to London St Pancras via Brussels and the Channel Tunnel.  The proposal, first put forward in 2007, was delayed by Eurotunnel safety regulations which required operators to use trainsets which could be divided in the Tunnel in the event of an emergency, allowing passengers to be transported out of the tunnel in two directions.  This regulation has now been relaxed, and it was envisaged that DB could begin direct London-Cologne services before the end of 2014. These plans have since been delayed, and services are not expected to start until at least 2018.

See also 
 Köln Messe/Deutz railway station
 Hauptbahnhof
 List of railway stations in North Rhine-Westphalia
 Odonia

References

Notes

Bibliography

External links 

 
 
 

!
Rhine-Ruhr S-Bahn stations
Buildings and structures in Cologne
Innenstadt, Cologne
S6 (Rhine-Ruhr S-Bahn)
S11 (Rhine-Ruhr S-Bahn)
S12 (Rhine-Ruhr S-Bahn)
S13 (Rhine-Ruhr S-Bahn)
Railway stations in Germany opened in 1859
Cologne-Bonn Stadtbahn stations
1859 establishments in Prussia
Transit centers in Germany